Rose of the World may refer to:

 Roza Mira, literally, The Rose of the World, the religious and philosophical teachings of Daniil Andreyev
 Rosamund Clifford, known as "Rose of the World", mistress of King Henry II of England
 Rosamund (disambiguation), a female name and a family name
 Rose of the World (1918 film), a 1918 American silent film
 Rose of the World (1925 film), 1925 American silent film
 Rose of the World, controversial Moscow-based organization which describes itself as "training for personality development"